The 2013 Austin Peay Governors football team represented Austin Peay State University during the 2013 NCAA Division I FCS football season. The Governors were led by first-year head coach Kirby Cannon, played their home games at Governors Stadium, and were a member of the Ohio Valley Conference. They finished the season 0–12, 0–8 in OVC play to finish in last place.

Schedule

Source: Schedule

References

Austin Peay
Austin Peay Governors football seasons
College football winless seasons
Austin Peay Governors football